Ingeborg Stoll-Laforge (11 February 1930, Breinig - Stolberg (Rhineland), Germany – 24 August 1958) was a female German motorcycle racer.

Early life 
Ingeborg Stoll-Laforge was born on 11 February 1930, in Breinig Stolberg (Rhineland), near Aachen, Germany to Maria (nee Moll) and Kurt Stoll. Her parents raced together, with Maria as Kurt's motorcycle sidecar passenger. Inge took over her mother's role in the sidecar when she turned 17.

Racing career 
Stoll began competing professionally as a female passenger in her father's NSU outfit in 1947. In December 1949, she married Belgian Jean Laforge but the marriage was short lived. Her father retired in 1951 to concentrate on running his driving school. She then joined sidecar driver Jacques Drion in 1952 and won the 1952 and 1954 French Sidecar Championships. Stoll and Drion competed in the World Sidecar Championship events from 1952 to 1957. 

The re-introduction of the Sidecar TT race into the 1954 Isle of Man TT races was controversial as it was opposed by the motorcycle manufacturers and also for the inclusion of Inge Stoll as the first female competitor at an Isle of Man TT race.

In May 1958, Stoll married Manfred Grunwald and was planning to give up her racing career, but Drion was unable to find a new passenger so she agreed to ride with him for another race.

At the 1958 Czechoslovakian Grand Prix, a non-championship event, the Norton sidecar outfit of Stoll and Drion, while holding second place, left the road on a right-hand corner during the penultimate lap. The machine hit a fence and overturned. Stoll was killed instantly and Drion died after being admitted to hospital.

Isle of Man TT race career

 *Event held on Clypse Course
 DNF 1957 Sidecar TT Race, broken hand-hold.

World Championship career 1952–1957

 Total number of points: 48

Sources

External links
 TT database rider profile iomtt.com
 TT database TT results iomtt.com

German sportswomen
German motorcycle racers
Isle of Man TT riders
1930 births
1958 deaths
Motorcycle racers who died while racing
Sport deaths in Czechoslovakia
Sidecar racers
Female motorcycle racers